Mohd Aiman Afif bin Md Afizul (born 18 February 2001) is a Malaysian professional footballer who plays as a midfielder for Malaysia Super League club Kedah Darul Aman.

Career statistics

Club

Honours

Kedah Darul Aman
 Malaysia Super League runner-up: 2021, 2022

References

External links
 

2001 births
Living people
People from Kedah
Malaysian people of Malay descent
Malaysian footballers
Kedah Darul Aman F.C. players
Malaysia Super League players
Association football midfielders
Competitors at the 2021 Southeast Asian Games
Southeast Asian Games competitors for Malaysia